Matlab Kamran oglu Guliyev (9 January 1959, Beylagan District, Azerbaijan SSR - 31 August 1992, Aghdam, Azerbaijan) was the National Hero of Azerbaijan and warrior during the First Nagorno-Karabakh War.

Early life and education 
Guliyev was born on January 9, 1959, in Beylagan District, Azerbaijan SSR. He completed his secondary education at the Secondary School No. 3 in Beylagan District. He was then admitted to the Jamshid Nakhchivanski Military Lyceum. He Guliyev was drafted to the Soviet Armed Forces and served in Ukraine. After completing his military service, he entered the Azerbaijan State Pedagogical University. Following his graduation in 1985, he started to work as a military trainer in the Secondary School No. 3 in Sumgayit. In 1992, he subsequently worked in the Ministry of Internal Affairs of Azerbaijan.

First Nagorno-Karabakh War 
When Armenians attacked the territories of Azerbaijan, Guliyev was ordered to the Agdam District. On August 31, 1992, he was killed in fight with Armenian armed troops in Agdam.

Personal life 
Guliyev was married and had two children.

Honors 
Guliyev was posthumously awarded the title of the "National Hero of Azerbaijan" by Presidential Decree No. 290 dated 6 November 1992.

He was buried at a Martyrs' Lane cemetery in Baku. The Secondary School No. 3 in Sumgayit was named after him.

See also 
 First Nagorno-Karabakh War
 List of National Heroes of Azerbaijan

References

Sources 
Vugar Asgarov. Azərbaycanın Milli Qəhrəmanları (Yenidən işlənmiş II nəşr). Bakı: "Dərələyəz-M", 2010, səh. 168–169.

1959 births
1992 deaths
Azerbaijani military personnel
Azerbaijani military personnel of the Nagorno-Karabakh War
Azerbaijani military personnel killed in action
National Heroes of Azerbaijan
People from Beylagan District